John Harvard  (June 4, 1938 – January 9, 2016) was a Canadian journalist, politician, and officeholder in Manitoba. He served as a federal Member of Parliament from 1988 to 2004, and was appointed the 23rd Lieutenant Governor of Manitoba just before Canada's 2004 federal election.

Career
Harvard was a broadcast journalist from 1957 to 1988. He worked for the Canadian Broadcasting Corporation (CBC) for eighteen years and was for many years the host of a popular call-in show in Winnipeg called Talk Back, on CJOB-AM. Coincidentally, his predecessor as lieutenant-governor, Peter Liba, worked as a journalist for CBC's competitor CanWest.

Member of Parliament
Harvard was elected to the House of Commons of Canada in the 1988 election as a Liberal, defeating incumbent Progressive Conservative George Minaker by 18,695 votes to 16,993 in the middle-class suburban riding of Winnipeg—St. James (in the previous election in 1984, the Liberal candidate had finished third). Harvard sat as a backbench member of the parliamentary opposition, led by John Turner and later Jean Chrétien, from 1988 to 1993.

The Liberal Party won the 1993 federal election, and Harvard was easily re-elected in Winnipeg—St. James, defeating his nearest competitor, Reformer Peter Blumenschein, by about 13,000 votes. He was not appointed to Chrétien's cabinet, but was named Parliamentary Secretary to the Minister of Public Works and Government Services in 1996.

Harvard was again re-elected without difficulty in the federal election of 1997, running in the redistributed riding of Charleswood—Assiniboia. He was named parliamentary secretary to the Minister of Agriculture and Agri-Food after the election, serving until 1998.

Harvard faced his most difficult bid for re-election in the 2000 campaign, narrowly defeating Canadian Alliance challenger Cyril McFate by 13,901 votes to 11,569. Progressive Conservative Curtis Moore finished third with 9,991 votes, causing many to regard the riding as winnable for a "united right" in the next election.

Harvard supported Paul Martin for the Liberal Party leadership over a period of several years, and it was perhaps for this reason that Jean Chrétien never appointed him to the Cabinet of Canada. As early as 2000, Harvard publicly suggested that Chrétien should consider resigning as party leader. When Martin became prime minister on December 12, 2003, Harvard was sworn into the Privy Council as parliamentary secretary to the minister of international trade.

Lieutenant Governor of Manitoba
Harvard resigned his parliamentary seat on May 6, 2004. It is rumoured that this was done at the urging of Winnipeg mayor Glen Murray, who was seeking the Liberal candidacy for a Winnipeg-area riding in the upcoming federal election.  It was announced the next day that Harvard would be appointed lieutenant-governor of Manitoba, and he was sworn in on June 30. Murray was unable to retain the seat for the Liberals.

The position of lieutenant-governor is largely ceremonial, and Harvard held very little direct influence over the government of Manitoba. While serving as the LG, as is the tradition, he and his then-spouse, Her Honour, Lenore Berscheid, resided in Government House (Manitoba) in Winnipeg.

Later life and death
In October 2005, Harvard was awarded an honorary Doctor of Laws degree from the University of Manitoba. In August 2009, after his term ended, he was succeeded by Lieutenant-Governor by Philip S. Lee. Harvard died of cancer at age of 77 on January 9, 2016.

Arms

References

External links
 

1938 births
2016 deaths
Liberal Party of Canada MPs
Lieutenant Governors of Manitoba
Members of the House of Commons of Canada from Manitoba
Members of the Order of Manitoba
Members of the King's Privy Council for Canada
Politicians from Winnipeg
21st-century Canadian politicians